Hypostomus oculeus is a species of catfish in the family Loricariidae. It is native to South America, where it occurs in the upper Japurá River basin in Colombia. The species reaches 21.7 cm (8.5 inches) in standard length and is believed to be a facultative air-breather.

References 

oculeus
Fish described in 1943